Marie J. Mergler (May 18, 1851 – May 18, 1901) was a 19th-century German-born American physician, surgeon, and medical writer. She began practice in Chicago in 1881, doing general practice at first and then limiting herself to obstetrics and gynaecology. In the latter, she  acquired great skill as a surgeon, and in this field stood among those at the head of her profession in what was then considered to be the northwestern United States. She served her alma mater as lecturer, professor, secretary and Dean. She held several hospital positions as consultant or on the attending staff.

She was connected with the Woman's Medical College of Chicago from the time of her graduation, and for many years, served as an executive officers of that institution, where she also occupied the chair of clinical and operative gynaecology. In 1899, Mergler was elected dean of the school, succeeding Dr. Isaac N. Danforth, resigned. In November 1895, she was elected head physician and surgeon to the Mary Thompson Hospital for Women and Children, from which position she resigned two years later. She was the attending surgeon to the Woman's Hospital of Chicago for many years, and was also on the hospital staff of the Post-Graduate school, where she conducted a clinic in operative gynecology. Her great achievement was in assisting women to obtain the very best opportunities for a thorough medical education in the Woman's Medical College at Chicago.

Early life and education

Marie Josepha Mergler was born in Mainstockheim, Bavaria, May 18, 1851. She was the youngest of three children. Her father, Dr. Francis R. Mergler, was a graduate of the University of Würzburg. Her mother, Henriette, descended from a German family—the Von Rittershausen.

When about one year old, her parents removed to the U.S. and located in Wheeling, Illinois, where her father practised his profession. Some time afterward, they removed to Palatine, Illinois, where he continued his practice until his death.

Owing to the limited advantages afforded by the district school, the father personally directed the early education of his children, and when the increasing demands for his professional services rendered this no longer possible, the instruction was continued by private teachers.

At seventeen, Mergler was graduated from the Cook County Normal School (now, Chicago State University, and one year later, entered the State Normal School at Oswego, New York (now, State University of New York at Oswego), where she was graduated from the classical course in 1871.

She was then appointed assistant principal of the Englewood High School, which position she held for four years. Finding, however, that the profession of teaching was too narrow a field and offered no incentive to the further prosecution of studies, she decided to adopt that of medicine, as she had acquired a love for it from her close association with her father, whom she had occasionally assisted in his practice.

She matriculated at the Woman's Medical College of Chicago in 1876. During her course she attracted the attention of her professors on account of her scholarship, and she was indebted to the late Dr. William H. Byford, founder of the school, for much of her knowledge of surgery, as she assisted him at his operations for several years. She was graduated from the college in 1879, being valedictorian of her class. There were three other women in the class, all of whom are successful women.

She was immediately elected Lecturer on Materia Medica, but was given one year's leave of absence for study. Mergler was the first woman graduate to compete successfully with the graduates of other Chicago medical colleges for the appointment as intern of the Cook County Hospital at Dunning, standing second in the competitive examination. She received the appointment and was assigned a position which, however, she was not allowed to fill. The place was given to a man who was not even required to take the examination. Determined not to be thwarted in having hospital experience, she went to Europe and studied one year at the University of Zurich, Switzerland, giving special attention to pathology and clinical medicine.

Career

In 1881, she returned to Chicago and began to establish a general practice.

In the Woman's Medical College she held the positions of Lecturer on Materia medica, Lecturer on Histology, of Materia Medica and Therapeutics, Clinical Instructor in Gynæcology, and Adjunct Professor of Gynæcology. After the death of Professor William H. Byford she was appointed his successor as Professor of Gynæcology. Since 1885, she held the office of Secretary of this institution. During her term of office, she demonstrated great executive ability, laboring untiringly to advance the school. In connection with Dr. Charles Warrington Earle, she succeeded in maintaining the high standard and broad lines of the institution begun by Dr. Byford and his colleagues, and greatly widened its opportunities for usefulness by aiding in its union with a wealthy university, that being Northwestern University.

At the Lincoln Street Dispensary, she built up a gynæcological clinic in which the work was conducted by herself and her assistants. In 1882, she was one of the first two women elected on the attending staff of the Cook County Hospital (now, John H. Stroger Jr. Hospital of Cook County). In 1886, she was appointed one of the attending surgeons at the Woman's Hospital of Chicago, and in 1890, gynæcologist to Wesley Hospital (now, Northwestern Memorial Hospital).

In November, 1895, she was elected Head Physician and Surgeon at the Mary Thompson Hospital for Women and Children. In this appointment, Mergler received the unanimous support of the Chicago Gynæcological Society, and also of the majority of the members of the medical profession in the city, a tribute to her skill. In 1899, she was appointed dean of the school by the trustees of the Northwestern University, a position she held at the time of her death.

Mergler distinguished herself for her ability in abdominal surgery. Her success in the classroom equalled that in the consulting room. Her lectures were scientific and rendered more valuable by her ability to classify her knowledge and her clear-cut mode of expressing herself. 

She contributed papers to some of the State Medical Societies and leading medical journals, and was the author of A Guide to the Study of Gynecology (1893), a textbook used in the School. Mergler was a member of the staff of collaborators on The Woman's Medical Journal.

She was a member of several medical societies, contributing her share to the support and welfare of each. These included the Chicago Medical Society, of the Mississippi Valley Medical Association, and the American Medical Association.

Later life and death
Mergler became ill August 1900, recovered partly, but left for California in April 1901, for rest and restoration of health. Arriving at Los Angeles, she was slightly better, but died in that city at the age of fifty years of pernicious anemia, May 18, 1901. Her mother, living at Palatine, Illinois and two sisters, Ernestine Schell and Anna Fritsch, survived her. The memorial service was held in Union Park Congregational Church, of which Mergler had been a member for many years.

Notes

References

Attribution
 
 
 

1851 births
1901 deaths
19th-century American women physicians
19th-century American physicians
19th-century American women writers
American medical writers
People from Bavaria
Physicians from Chicago
Textbook writers
Writers from Chicago
Chicago State University alumni
State University of New York at Oswego alumni